Alf or ALF may refer to:

Arts and entertainment
 ALF (TV series), American sitcom
 ALF: The Animated Series, based on the TV series
 ALF (video game), released by Sega in 1989
 Alf (album), a 1984 album by Alison Moyet

Fictional characters
 ALF (character), the title character of the American sitcom
 Alf Garnett, from the BBC's Till Death Us Do Part
 Alf Mason, character in  American animated television series Fox's Peter Pan & the Pirates
 Alf Mushpie, in the comic strip Bloom County
 Alf Roberts, from the British television program Coronation Street
 Alf Stewart, from the Australian television program Home and Away
 Alf Tupper, in the comic Victor
 Alf Wit, in the comic The Beano
 Sir Alf, in the film Monty Python and the Holy Grail, eaten by the Black Beast of Aaaaarrrrrrggghhh
 'Unlucky' Alf, in the BBC's The Fast Show
 One of the title characters in Alf, Bill and Fred, a 1964 American animated short film

People
 Alf (name), given name, nickname or surname, including a list of people with the name
 Adam Le Fondre, English footballer whose nickname is ALF or Alfie due to his initials

Places
 Alf, Rhineland-Palatinate, a local municipality in Zell, Germany
 Alf (river) or Alfbach, a tributary of the Moselle River in Germany

Companies and organizations
 ALF Products, former personal-computer products manufacturer
 Afar Liberation Front, an Ethiopian political party of the Afar people
 Africa Leadership Forum, a Nigerian organization
 American LaFrance, a former emergency and vocational vehicle manufacturer
 American Legacy Foundation, the former name of the modern-day Truth Initiative
 American Liver Foundation, an American organization for liver health and disease prevention
 American Lighthouse Foundation, an American organization 
 Animal Liberation Front, a name used by animal liberationists
 Arab Liberation Front, a Palestinian group

Health
 ALF (psychology), a group therapy model
 Acute liver failure
 Assisted living facility, facility providing assistance to aged, infirm, or disabled adults

Mythology
 Alf, the son of Alrik, of Yngvi and Alf
 Alf, the son of Sigar, of Alf and Alfhild
 Alf, one of the álfar

Technology
 alf, ISO-639-3 code for the Alege language 
 ALF (proof assistant), dependently typed programming language/theorem prover
 Action Language for Foundational UML
 Advanced Library Format, an ASIC databook
 Algebraic Logic Functional programming language
 Application layer framing
 Application Lifecycle Framework, integration framework for ALM tools
 Atomic line filter, an advanced optical filter

Transportation
 ALF, vehicle license plate prefix for Hildesheim (district), Germany
 ALF, IATA airport code for Alta Airport, Norway
 ALF, National Rail code for Alfreton railway station, UK
 Alf (barque), a barque wrecked on Haisboro Sands in 1909

Other uses
 Atlas linguistique de la France, a dialect atlas published between 1902 and 1910

See also
 ALFSEA, or Allied Land Forces South East Asia, the British Army unit during the Second World War
 Alfred (disambiguation)
 Alfie (disambiguation)
 Alph (disambiguation)